Victor Crus Rydberg (born March 21, 1995) is a Swedish ice hockey player. He is currently playing with the Kalmar HC of the Hockeyettan (Division.1). He previously played originally with Linköpings in the Swedish J20 SuperElit and Elitserien. Rydberg was selected by the New York Islanders in the 5th round (136th overall) of the 2013 NHL Entry Draft.

Playing career
He made his Elitserien debut playing with Linköpings HC during the 2012–13 Elitserien season. After his first major junior North American season in 2013–14 with the Plymouth Whalers of the Ontario Hockey League, Rydberg joined Islanders' affiliate, the Bridgeport Sound Tigers on an amateur try-out for the remainder of the year on March 31, 2014.

At the conclusion of his major junior career with the Whalers, Cruc Rydberg returned to Sweden in signing with HockeyAllsvenskan club, HC Vita Hästen. In the 2015–16 season, Rydberg contributed with 8 goals and 12 points in 45 games. In the following off-season, Rydberg as a free agent opted to continue his playing career in the third-tier Hockeyettan with Vimmerby HC on June 23, 2016.

Career statistics

Regular season and playoffs

International

References

External links

1995 births
Living people
Bridgeport Sound Tigers players
Linköping HC players
New York Islanders draft picks
Plymouth Whalers players
Swedish ice hockey centres
HC Vita Hästen players
People from Växjö
Sportspeople from Kronoberg County